Bab al-Shams (  : Gate of the Sun) was a Palestinian encampment in the West Bank that housed 250 Palestinian and foreign activists for two nights in January 2013. They erected 25 tents on private Palestinian land in the E1 area where Israel has decided to build more than 3500 housing units.

It was in the E1 area Israel intends to fill with houses, and, according to David Shulman, impede thereby the construction of a Palestinian state. The site was forcibly evacuated on January 12, when the IDF arrived in the middle of the night, tore down the tents, and also beat and arrested many of the activists. 100 people were arrested. On January 16, the Palestinian Authority created a formal village council for Bab al-Shams.

The Israeli government intended to remove the tent outpost, claiming that it was illegal, but the activists received an injunction from the Supreme Court of Israel prohibiting the government from doing so for 6 days. The following day, the occupants were evacuated by the Israeli army, in defiance of the Supreme Court injunction. An Israeli police spokesman said the court allowed for the removal of the protesters even if the tents would stay temporarily. 100 people were arrested.

Comments
Responding to the eviction of the site by Israeli police, the UN secretary General Ban Ki-moon, noted that the protestors had been "largely non-violent", adding that the right to stage peaceful protest should be "fully respected". Ban re-iterated his position that Israel should scrap its plans for development in the E1 area stating that "Israeli settlements in the West Bank are illegal under international law" and that "any such settlement plans for E1 must be rescinded".

After ordering the evacuation of the site, despite an Israeli Supreme court injunction against its demolition, the Israeli prime minister, Benjamin Netanyahu, stated that "We will not allow anyone to harm the contiguity between Jerusalem and Maale Adumim". Palestinian leaders also commented on the event.

Majid Suweilim, professor of political science at Al Quds University described Bab al Shams as "a direct challenge to the shift of Israeli policy towards the extreme right". He said that the message from the activists was that discussion over negotiations and international pressure had failed and that on the ground there should be a shift towards "democratic, resilient, peaceful popular resistance".

The protest mirrors Israeli settlements tactics, though Palestinian activists say "this land is ours". A Time report on the event contrasted the "unusual briskness" in which the Palestinian site was evacuated with the Jewish settlement outposts of which there are around 100, that although illegal under Israeli law, are supplied with utilities by the Israeli government and protected by the Israeli army.

Name
The name of the village is inspired by the novel Bab Al Shams by the Lebanese writer Elias Khoury who supported the idea.

Culture
Arab Israeli singer Tamer Nafar wrote and sang a song about Bab al-Shams.

References

2013 establishments in the State of Palestine
2013 disestablishments in the State of Palestine
2013 in Jerusalem